The San Francisco River is a  river in the southwest United States, the largest tributary of the Upper Gila River. It originates near Alpine, Arizona and flows into New Mexico before reentering Arizona and joining the Gila downstream from Clifton.

See also

 List of Arizona rivers
 List of New Mexico rivers
 List of tributaries of the Colorado River

References

External links

 San Francisco River

Rivers of Arizona
Rivers of New Mexico
Rivers of Greenlee County, Arizona
Rivers of Apache County, Arizona
Tributaries of the Gila River
Rivers of Catron County, New Mexico